The 2022 Italian F4 Championship Powered by Abarth was the ninth season of the Italian F4 Championship. The series moved onto new generation of the Formula 4 cars, continuing its collaboration with Tatuus and Abarth.

Teams and drivers

Race calendar and results 
The calendar was revealed on 8 October 2021.

Championship standings 
Points were awarded to the top 10 classified finishers in each race. No points were awarded for pole position or fastest lap. The final classifications for the individual standings were obtained by summing up the scores on the 16 best results obtained during the races held.

Drivers' championship

Secondary classes standings

Teams' championship 
Each team acquired the points earned by their two best drivers in each race.

Notes

References

External links 

 
 ACI Sport page

Italian F4 Championship seasons
Italian
F4 Championship